HD 104985, formally named Tonatiuh, is a solitary star with a exoplanetary companion in the northern constellation of Camelopardalis. The companion is designated HD 104985 b and named Meztli. This star has an apparent visual magnitude of 5.78 and thus is dimly visible to the naked eye under favorable seeing conditions. It is located at a distance of approximately 329 light years from the Sun based on parallax, but is drifting closer with a radial velocity of −20 km/s.

The stellar classification of this star is G8.5IIIb, indicating this is an evolved giant star that has exhausted the supply of hydrogen at its core then cooled and expanded off the main sequence. It is located in the red clump region of the HR diagram, suggesting it is on the horizontal branch and generating energy through core helium fusion. The star is approximately 4.4 billion years old with 1.2 times the mass of the Sun and has expanded to 10.6 times the Sun's radius. It is radiating 51 times the luminosity of the Sun from its enlarged photosphere at an effective temperature of 4,730 K.

In 2003, radial velocity measurements made by the Okayama Planet Search Program led to the announcement of an exoplanetary companion. Since the inclination of the exoplanet's orbital plane is unknown, only a lower bound on its mass can be determined. It has at least 8.3 times the mass of Jupiter.

Naming
HD 104985 is the star's entry in the Henry Draper Catalogue. Following its discovery in 2003 the planet was designated HD 104985 b. In July 2014 the International Astronomical Union launched NameExoWorlds, a process for giving proper names to certain exoplanets and their host stars. The process involved public nomination and voting for the new names. In December 2015, the IAU announced the winning names were Tonatiuh for this star and Meztli for its planet.

The winning names were those submitted by the Sociedad Astronomica Urania of Morelos, Mexico. 'Tonatiuh' was the Aztec god of the Sun; 'Meztli' was the Aztec goddess of the Moon.

In 2016, the IAU organized a Working Group on Star Names (WGSN) to catalog and standardize proper names for stars. In its first bulletin of July 2016, the WGSN explicitly recognized the names of exoplanets and their host stars approved by the Executive Committee Working Group Public Naming of Planets and Planetary Satellites, including the names of stars adopted during the 2015 NameExoWorlds campaign. This star is now so entered in the IAU Catalog of Star Names.

See also 
 List of extrasolar planets

References 

G-type giants
Horizontal-branch stars
Planetary systems with one confirmed planet

Camelopardalis (constellation)
Durchmusterung objects
104985
058952
4609
Tonatiuh